Platinum & Gold Collection is a compilation of Lit's greatest hits, released on May 4, 2004, by RCA Records. It contains material from their A Place in the Sun and Atomic albums.

Track listing
All songs were written by A. Jay Popoff and Jeremy Popoff, except where noted.
 "Something To Someone" – 4:50
 "My Own Worst Enemy" – 2:49
 "Quicksand" – 3:17
 "Miserable" – 4:17
 "Lipstick and Bruises" – 3:01
 "Happy in the Meantime (remix)" (A. J. Popoff, J. Popoff, Danny Walker) – 2:45
 "Over My Head" – 3:40
 "Zip-Lock" – 3:33
 "Addicted" – 2:57
 "Four" – 3:22
 "The Party's Over" – 2:42
 "Down (acoustic)" – 3:45

Personnel
 A. Jay Popoff - lead vocals 
 Jeremy Popoff - guitar, backing vocals
 Kevin Baldes - bass guitar
 Allen Shellenberger - drums

References

Lit (band) albums
2004 greatest hits albums
RCA Records compilation albums